Second modernity is a phrase coined by the German sociologist Ulrich Beck, and is his word for the period after modernity.

Where modernity broke down agricultural society in favour of industrial society, second modernity transforms industrial society into a new and more reflexive network society or information society .

Risk society

Second modernity is marked by a new awareness of the risks — risks to all forms of life, plant, animal and human — created by the very successes of modernity in tackling the problem of human scarcity . Systems that previously seemed to offer protection from risks both natural and social are increasingly recognised as producing new man-made risks on a global scale as a byproduct of their functioning . Such systems become part of the problem, not the solution. Modernisation and information advances themselves create new social dangers, such as cybercrime (He 2012, 69), while scientific advances open up new areas, like cloning or genetic modification, where decisions are necessarily made without adequate capacity to assess longterm consequences .

Recognising the fresh dilemmas created by this reflexive modernization, Beck has suggested a new "cosmopolitan Realpolitik" to overcome the difficulties of a world in which national interests can no longer be promoted effectively at the national level alone .

Knowledge society
Second modernity has also been linked to the so-called knowledge society, marked by a pluralisation of different types of knowledge . It is characterised in particular by knowledge-dependent risks — the uncertainties manufactured by the information world itself .

Resistance

Various forms of resistance to second modernity have emerged, among them, for example, Euroscepticism .

Beck sees al-Qaeda as a by-product of, as well as resistance to, second modernity, not only in its use of information-technology tools, but also in its syncretist ideology .

See also

Sources

Further reading

External links
 Ulrich Beck, 'World Risk Society'
 U. Beck, 'Varieties of Second Modernity'

Historiography
Postmodern theory
Modernity